Grits Sandwiches for Breakfast is the debut studio album by American rapper Kid Rock. Released on November 27, 1990, by Jive Records, the album is marked by a straightforward hip hop music style, in sharp contrast to the largely rock-oriented sound of his later albums.

Jive found the album difficult to promote due to its explicit lyrics, but upon release, it made Kid Rock one of Detroit hip hop's most successful recording artists, selling over 100,000 copies upon release.

History
Kid Rock began his professional music career as a member of the hip hop music group the Beast Crew in the late 1980s. During this time, Kid Rock met rapper D-Nice, which led to Kid Rock opening at local shows for Boogie Down Productions. During this time, Kid Rock began his professional association with producer Mike E. Clark, who was initially skeptical of the idea of a white rapper, but was impressed by Kid Rock's performance; Kid Rock had prepared his own beats and used his own turntables to demonstrate his skills for Clark. In 1988, Clark produced a series of demos with Kid Rock, which led to offers from six major record labels, including Atlantic and CBS Records. With the help of D-Nice, Kid Rock signed with Jive Records at the age of 17, releasing his debut studio album, Grits Sandwiches for Breakfast in 1990, which featured production by D-Nice and Too Short. According to Kid Rock, the contract with Jive resulted in animosity from fellow rapper Vanilla Ice, who felt that he should have been signed.

Artistry
In contrast to Kid Rock's later albums, Grits Sandwiches for Breakfast features a straightforward hip hop sound. While the album primarily reflects what reviewers perceived as a strong Beastie Boys influence, "Grits Sandwiches nevertheless contains a few elements of the Bob Seger-loving, turntable-scratching dirt-ass pimp character who would later emerge as the American Bad Ass", according to Allmusic's Johnny Loftus. Other influences claimed by reviewers on the album's music include LL Cool J and Rob Base. "With a One Two" samples the Doobie Brothers' "China Grove", predicting Kid Rock's later shift to rap rock.

Release and aftermath
To promote the album, Kid Rock toured nationally with Ice Cube, D-Nice, Yo-Yo and Too Short; Detroit artist James "the Blackman" Harris was Kid Rock's DJ on this tour. During instore promotions for the album, Kid Rock met and developed a friendship with local rapper Eminem, who frequently challenged Kid Rock to rap battles. Grits Sandwiches for Breakfast sold over 100,000 copies, signaling national success for the young Kid Rock; the album's success made Kid Rock one of the two biggest rap stars in Detroit in 1990, along with local independent rapper Esham. Despite the album's commercial success, Kid Rock was underpromoted by Jive Records; because the album contained "unprintable" explicit lyrics on every song, Jive found it difficult to market the album, producing few singles and no music videos. The lead single, "Yo-Da-Lin in the Valley", which was about oral sex, proved to be controversial when WSUC-FM, a college radio station, was fined $23,700 by the FCC for playing it. Ultimately, unfavorable comparisons to Vanilla Ice led to Jive dropping Kid Rock, according to Mike E. Clark.

Critical reception

Retrospective reviews have looked unfavorably upon the album, with Rolling Stone listing it as one of "20 terrible albums by great artists" and gave it two and a half out of five stars in its album guide. Allmusic's Johnny Loftus gave the album two out of five, writing, "despite Kid's distinct, hard-edged flow and references to the building blocks that would later make his career, Grits Sandwiches for Breakfast is a mostly laughable recording". Robert Christgau gave the album a "dud" rating. However, the album's music has also received praise from The Village Voice, which called the song “Wax the Booty” a "classic" in an article by Chaz Kangas, who called the track "smooth and sinister" and "a worthwhile tale of fornication from the era where sex in storytelling was king."

Track listing

Personnel

Robert James Ritchie – Main Artist, Vocals, Producer (tracks: 1-4, 6, 9-10, 12-13), Mixing (tracks: 1-2, 4-13)
Roz Davis – Vocals (track 11)
Doug E. Doug – Talking (track 9)
Patricia Halligan – Guitar (tracks: 4, 6, 9)
David Bright – Keyboards (track 11)
Keenan Foster – Keyboards programming (track 7)
Joe Mendelson – Programming (track 3)
Todd Anthony Shaw – Producer (tracks: 5, 7)
The Dice Sound – Producer (tracks: 8, 11)
The Blackman – Co-Producer (track 1)
Mike E. Clark – Co-Producer (track 1)
Barbera Aimes – Mixing (tracks: 1, 8, 13), Engineering
Walter C. Griggs – Mixing (track 2)
Derrick Jones – Mixing (tracks: 3, 12)
Dwayne Sumal – Mixing (track 11), Engineering
Al Eaton – Engineering
Anthony Saunders – Engineering
Chris Floberg – Engineering
Eric Gast – Engineering
Sherman Foote – Engineering
Tim Latham – Engineering
Tom Vercillo – Engineering
Tom Coyne – Mastering
Todd James – Artwork
Michael Benabib – Photography

References

External links

Kid Rock albums
1990 albums
1990 debut albums
RCA Records albums
Jive Records albums
Midwest hip hop albums
Albums produced by Mike E. Clark
Albums produced by Too Short